The colloquial term goin' bananas (or going bananas) refers to acting in an erratic or insane manner, often by losing one's temper.

As a title, the term may refer to:

 Goin' Bananas (album), a 1977 album by the group Side Effect
"Goin' Bananas", a track from that album
 Goin' Bananas (TV series), a sketch comedy show on Philippine television
 Going Bananas (U.S. series), an American live-action superhero series
 Going Bananas (film), an American comedy movie

See also

Banana (disambiguation)
Go Bananas!
Herbie Goes Bananas
The Banana Splits